Iron Gomis (born 8 November 1999) is a French professional footballer who plays as a midfielder for  club Amiens.

Career
On 9 March 2019, Gomis signed his first professional contract with Amiens. He made his professional debut with Amiens in a 1–0 Ligue 2 win over Nancy on 22 August 2020.

On 31 January 2022, Gomis returned to Dunkerque on another loan.

Personal life
Gomis was born in France and is of Senegalese descent through his father.

References

External links
 
 

1999 births
Living people
Footballers from Marseille
French footballers
French sportspeople of Senegalese descent
Association football midfielders
Amiens SC players
USL Dunkerque players
Ligue 2 players
Championnat National players
Championnat National 3 players